Peristeria pendula is a species of orchid occurring from Trinidad to Central America and tropical South America.

References

External links 

pendula
Orchids of Trinidad